William John Reichardt (June 24, 1930 – June 1, 2004) was a fullback and placekicker in the National Football League who played for the Green Bay Packers. Reichardt played collegiate ball for the University of Iowa before being drafted by Green Bay Packers in the 7th round of the 1952 NFL Draft.  He played professionally for one season, in 1952.

Reichardt subsequently opened a men's clothing store in Des Moines, Ia., and became a prominent businessman and community leader. An engaging speaker with homespun charm, Reichardt's business motto was that no sale was ever final and that if there was ever a problem with one of his suits, he would make sure to make things right. He died of cancer on June 1, 2004.

Born to Herb Reichardt on June 24, 1930, William "Bill" Reichardt attended Iowa City public schools until his graduation in 1948.  In recognition for his high school football exploits, Reichardt received a place on the All-State football team in 1946 and 1947.  Continuing to play football, he received a Bachelor of Science degree in economics from the University of Iowa in 1952.

After graduation, Reichardt spent one season with the Green Bay Packers and then joined the Air Force, where he served as a First Lieutenant for two years during the Korean War.  He founded Reichardt's Inc.--a chain of men's clothing stores—and has been very active in community affairs.  In addition, Reichardt started the Little All-American Football League in Des Moines and coached for 30 years.

In 1964 Reichardt was elected to the Iowa State Legislature where he served Polk County for two years in the Iowa House of Representatives; in 1966 won election to the Iowa State Senate, where he served four years. During his tenure in state government Reichardt sponsored the bill to resume an annual Iowa – Iowa State football game.

In 1994, Reichardt was a Democratic candidate for governor during the primary elections and in 1999 he circulated a petition to become a mayoral candidate for the City of Des Moines, but did not pursue the position.

Legacy 

Camerado Publishing released a novel entitled The Best Seller, written by Bill's son, Doug Reichardt and granddaughter, Katie Bishop. The novel chronicles Reichardt's early business career and the relationship principles which led to his notoriety in the community.

References

1930 births
2004 deaths
Sportspeople from Iowa City, Iowa
Players of American football from Iowa
American football fullbacks
American football placekickers
Iowa Hawkeyes football players
Green Bay Packers players
American athlete-politicians
Candidates in the 1994 United States elections
Democratic Party members of the Iowa House of Representatives
Democratic Party Iowa state senators
Deaths from cancer in Iowa
Iowa City High School alumni